Sr. Ávila (English: Don Ávila) is a Mexican television series created by Marcelo Slavitch and Walter Slavitch, and aired by HBO Latinoamérica.

Roberto Ávila is a middle-class funeral parlor employee, doting husband and father. He is also a cunning hit man. When he decides to head an organization of contract killers, the thin veil between his ordinary and hidden lives wears quickly. In this seedy underworld of hired crime, every entanglement falls into the hands of Sr. Avila—who must decide who stays and who goes.

The series has executive production by Luis F. Peraza, Roberto Rios, Paul Drago and Gabriela Remirez of HBO Latin America Originals, and Fernando Rovzar, Billy Rovzar and Alexis Fridman of Lemon Films. Sr. Ávila is directed by Fernando Rovzar along with Alejandro Lozano, and the script was written by Walter and Marcelo Slavich, who also were the authors of Epitafios, another original production HBO Latin America.

Cast 
 Tony Dalton as Roberto Ávila
 Carlos Aragón as Iván Alcázar
 Camila Selser as Ana Solares
 Juan Carlos Remolina as Detective Sánchez
 Nailea Norvind as María Ávila (seasons 1–2)
 Adrián Alonso as Emiliano Ávila (seasons 1–2)
 Ilse Salas as Erika Duarte (seasons 2–4)
 Jorge Caballero as Ismael Rueda (seasons 1–2)
 Hernán Mendoza as Ybarra
 Fernando Ciangherotti as Nicolás Duarte (season 3)
 Ari Brickman as El Croata (seasons 1–3)
 Rebecca Jones as Dra. Mola (season 2)
 Mauricio Isaac as Blas (season 2)
 Margarita Muñoz as Magda "Maggie" Muñoz (seasons 1–2)
 Daniel Martínez as Díaz (seasons 2–3)
 Iliana Fox as Tamara (seasons 1–2)
 Martijn Kuiper as Cardoso (season 3)
 Adal Ramones as Ciego (seasons 1–2)
 Sofía Sisniega as Luna (seasons 1–2)
 Jean Paul Leroux as Jesús "Chucho" Galván (season 3)
 Paulina Gaitán as Juliana Rivas (season 1)
 Alex Sirvent as El Chulo (seasons 1)
 Michel Brown as Daniel Molina (season 3)
 Fernando Gaviria as Bermúdez (seasons 1)
 Javier Díaz Dueñas as Patrón (seasons 1)
 Marcela Guirado as Natalia (seasons 3)
 Veronica Falcón as Madre Ismael (seasons 1–2)

Episodes

Series overview 
<onlyinclude>

Season 1 (2013)

Season 2 (2014)

Season 3 (2016)

Season 4 (2018)

References

External links 

2013 Mexican television series debuts
2016 Mexican television series debuts
Spanish-language HBO original programming
HBO Latin America original programming
Mexican television miniseries
2010s Mexican television series
2010s television miniseries
Mexican crime television series
Mexican drama television series